The Daihatsu E-series engine is a range of compact three-cylinder, internal combustion piston engines, designed by Daihatsu, which is a subsidiary of Toyota. The petrol-driven series has cast iron engine blocks and aluminum cylinder heads, and are of either SOHC or DOHC design, with belt driven heads.

The E series engine was first presented in the summer of 1985, as the EB, a replacement for the two-cylinder AB engine used in Daihatsu's Kei cars until then. The engine was Daihatsu's second three-cylinder design. Originally with two valves per cylinder, four-valve versions later appeared as did turbocharged versions. The engine is quite light, with the original EB-10 weighing in at  depending on transmission fitment.

EB-series (550 cc)
The EB-series is a  version built in Daihatsu's Osaka plant in Japan, meant for their domestic market range of Kei cars. Bore is 62 mm and stroke is 60.5 mm, with a firing order of 1—2—3. Power claims for the very earliest Mira/Cuore models are in gross rather than net, which explains slight differences in power ratings for the first few years. This engine has not been exported to any great extent, with Daihatsu's export models usually receiving the larger ED and C-series engines.

The EB-series was only ever available with an SOHC valvetrain and two valves per cylinder, as Daihatsu were late to adopt multi-valve technology for their kei car range. However, the EB was available with an IHI turbocharger and intercooler, originally carburetted but later with fuel injection. This is still the only Kei engine to have reached the 64 PS threshold with only two valves per cylinder. There is also a rare supercharged version developed for the Hijet Pickup, to provide extra low-down torque and allow for an air conditioning unit to be fitted and used even when heavily loaded. This engine was also used for an economy version of the Italian Innocenti Mini, until replaced by the later 660 cc EF engine.

Applications:
 Daihatsu Mira/Cuore (L70/71)
 Daihatsu Leeza (L100)
 Daihatsu Hijet/Atrai (S80/81)
 1987-1990 Innocenti 500 L/LS

ED-series (850 cc)
The ED-series is a  version originally intended for the export versions of the Cuore/Mira. The ED-series had undergone several changes from being carbureted 'ED-10' to 'ED-DE' where the introduction of fuel injected DOHC had been introduced, reviving this newly redesigned engine. This engine has never been available in the domestic Japanese market. In 1994 Daihatsu equipped the ED series with indirect multipoint fuel injection, called the ED-20. Daihatsu fitted this 847 cc displacement ED-20 engine to the L500 series 1994.09–1998.05 Daihatsu Cuore/Domino/Handi export model and in early export versions of the Daihatsu Move. Bore is 66.6 mm and stroke is 81 mm.

The ED engine was to undergo a long development as production was later taken over by Malaysia's Perodua. In its latest DVVT form, called 'ED-VE', it was kept in production until 2014 for the Perodua Viva. There was also a short-lived special version for the Swiss markets, where several cantons had tax systems which favoured cars of less than 800 cc. This, the ED-10A, had a two millimeter narrower bore (64.6 x 81 mm) for a displacement of 796 cc, and had also been license-made by the now-defunct Asia Motors to be fitted in the Towner, which was a licensed copy of the Daihatsu Hijet.

Applications:
 1986.10–1990.05 Daihatsu Cuore/Domino/Handi (L80)
 1999–19?? Daihatsu Charade (G100, New Zealand)
 1994.09–1998.05 Daihatsu Cuore/Domino/Handi (L500 series)
 1996.10-1999.10 Daihatsu Move (L601)
 2001.07–2006 Daihatsu Ceria (Indonesia)
 1994–2007 Perodua Kancil
 2001–2007 Perodua Kelisa
 2007–2014 Perodua Viva

Versions

EF-series (660 cc)
The EF-series is a  version designed to replace the EB series engine when kei car regulations changed for 1990. It was first seen in the Daihatsu Mira when it was facelifted in March 1990. The bore is 68 mm (expanded from 62) and stroke is 60.5 mm. Having undergone a long development, a myriad versions of this engine have been developed, and fitted to a multitude of Daihatsu products. Production ended in December 2007, by which time the new KF engine had replaced the EF across the board. The EF was nearly as light as its predecessor, with a 2004 EF-SE clocking in at  - this with the added weight of modern emissions equipment and fuel injection.

Versions

EJ-series (1 litre)
The EJ-series appeared in February 1998, its first generation is known as 'EJ-DE' was used in the generation of Daihatsu Mira L700 (Exported out of Japan Models)/Perodua Kelisa & Daihatsu Move L900 (Exported out of Japan Models)/ Perodua Kenari. It is a DOHC, 12-valve inline three-cylinder water-cooled engine. An upgrade of this engine was made after the introduction of Daihatsu Mira Avy L250 series (Exported out of Japan Models)/Perodua Viva & Perodua Myvi's First Generation in 2007, where the new engine was known as 'EJ-VE' which was included with a DVVT system for fuel efficiency and meeting new Euro standards. The Perodua Myvi's First Generation stopped using this engine after a while due to lacking of demand from the public. After the Perodua Viva was discontinued in 2014 and Daihatsu Xenia in Indonesia stopped offering the 'EJ-VE' series of 1.0 litre variant since August 2016, it is no longer used in any automotive applications and is succeeded by Toyota KR engine built by Daihatsu for Daihatsu Sigra 1.0. Production of the EJ-VE engine (for upright placement) is continued for industrial use.

Applications:
 Perodua Kenari
 Perodua Viva

Versions

See also
 List of Toyota engines

References

E
Straight-three engines